John Genest (1764–1839) was an English clergyman and theatre historian.

Life
He was the son of John Genest of Dunker's Hill, Devon. He was educated at Westminster School, entered 9 May 1780 as a pensioner at Trinity College, Cambridge, and graduated B.A. 1784 and M.A. 1787. He took holy orders, and was for many years curate of a Lincolnshire village. Subsequently, he became private chaplain to the Duke of Ancaster.

Compelled by ill-health to retire, he went to Bath, Somerset for the benefit of the waters. Here he appears to have remained until his death, which took place, after nine years of illness, at his residence in Henry Street, 15 December 1839. He was buried in St. James's Church.

Works
During his times in Bath he wrote Some Account of the English Stage from the Restoration in 1660 to 1830, Bath, 10 vols. 1832. It is accurate and well-researched.

References

Notes

Attribution

1764 births
1839 deaths
18th-century English Anglican priests
19th-century English Anglican priests
Historians of theatre